The Alcalde has been the alumni magazine of The University of Texas at Austin since 1913, and is published by the university's alumni association, the Texas Exes.

The magazine was named for Oran M. Roberts, the governor who signed the university into existence and whose nickname was "Old Alcalde."

It is published six times a year and mailed to the 96,000 members of the Texas Exes.

References

External links
 The Alcalde
 Alcalde archive at HathiTrust

1913 establishments in Texas
Alumni magazines
Alcalde, The
Magazines established in 1913
Magazines published in Austin, Texas
University of Texas at Austin